2014 Northern Iraq offensive may refer to:

 Northern Iraq offensive (June 2014)
 Northern Iraq offensive (August 2014)